is a Japanese competitive snowboarder from Asahikawa, Hokkaido. She won the silver medal in the Women's Parallel Giant Slalom in the 2014 Winter Olympics in Sochi, Russia. At the 2018 Winter Olympics in Pyeongchang, South Korea, she placed 5th in the Women's Parallel Giant Slalom.

References

External links
 
 

1983 births
Living people
Japanese female snowboarders
Olympic snowboarders of Japan
Snowboarders at the 2002 Winter Olympics
Snowboarders at the 2006 Winter Olympics
Snowboarders at the 2010 Winter Olympics
Snowboarders at the 2014 Winter Olympics
Snowboarders at the 2018 Winter Olympics
Snowboarders at the 2022 Winter Olympics
Medalists at the 2014 Winter Olympics
Olympic silver medalists for Japan
Olympic medalists in snowboarding
Snowboarders at the 2003 Asian Winter Games
21st-century Japanese women